

409001–409100 

|-bgcolor=#f2f2f2
| colspan=4 align=center | 
|}

409101–409200 

|-bgcolor=#f2f2f2
| colspan=4 align=center | 
|}

409201–409300 

|-bgcolor=#f2f2f2
| colspan=4 align=center | 
|}

409301–409400 

|-bgcolor=#f2f2f2
| colspan=4 align=center | 
|}

409401–409500 

|-bgcolor=#f2f2f2
| colspan=4 align=center | 
|}

409501–409600 

|-bgcolor=#f2f2f2
| colspan=4 align=center | 
|}

409601–409700 

|-bgcolor=#f2f2f2
| colspan=4 align=center | 
|}

409701–409800 

|-bgcolor=#f2f2f2
| colspan=4 align=center | 
|}

409801–409900 

|-bgcolor=#f2f2f2
| colspan=4 align=center | 
|}

409901–410000 

|-bgcolor=#f2f2f2
| colspan=4 align=center | 
|}

References 

409001-410000